Alfonso Grullart (born 13 July 1967) is a Dominican Republic weightlifter. He competed in the men's featherweight event at the 1996 Summer Olympics.

References

External links
 

1967 births
Living people
Dominican Republic male weightlifters
Olympic weightlifters of the Dominican Republic
Weightlifters at the 1996 Summer Olympics
Place of birth missing (living people)
20th-century Dominican Republic people